IAMAS may refer to:

 International Association of Meteorology and Atmospheric Sciences
 Institute of Advanced Media Arts and Sciences